George Wang (born Wang Yie, 12 November 1918 – 27 March 2015)  was a Taiwanese actor and producer who appeared in a multitude of Italian films.

Biography

Born in Dandong, Liaoning, Wang enrolled the Shanghai drama school China Film Studio in 1938 and the following year he made his film debut in Defending Our Homeland (保家鄉).  In 1949, Wang moved to Taiwan, becoming one of the most important stars in the early years of Taiwanese cinema.

At the end of the 1950s he moved to Italy, where he was a very active character actor in genre films, mainly spy films, adventure films and Spaghetti Westerns, being mostly cast in roles of villains. Thanks to his good knowledge of English, he was also active in a number of English language productions, notably appearing in Nicholas Ray's 55 Days at Peking. After portraying Machete, a Mexican antagonist in the 1967 film Taste of Killing, Wang claimed that he was the first Asian actor to play a non-Asian role in a non-Asian country.

In 1976 Wang moved to Hong Kong, where with his son Don he founded the film production
company "Wang Film Company". In 1978 he returned to Taiwan and back to acting, winning in 1981 a Golden Horse Award for Best Supporting Actor for his performance in The Coldest Winter in Peking (皇天后土).

Death

Wang died on 27 March 2015 of heart attack at 96 years old, and he was buried thirteen days later. He received a  posthumous presidential citation in recognition of his contributions to Taiwanese cinema.

Filmography

E meng chu xing (1951) as Luo Ping
The Dam on the Yellow River (1960) as Wang (as Wang Jie)
Mi yue feng bo (1960) as Chin CHun-Hsiung
The Mongols (1961) as Subodai
55 Days at Peking (1963) as Boxer Chief (uncredited)
The Pirates of Malaysia (1964) as Sho Pa
008: Operation Exterminate (1965) as Tanaka
Spy in Your Eye (1965) as Ming
The 10th Victim (1965) as Chinese hunter
James Tont operazione U.N.O. (1965) as Kayo
The Almost Perfect Crime (1966) as Chinese Driver
Dr. Goldfoot and the Girl Bombs (1966) as Fong (uncredited)
Taste for Killing (1966) as Ming
Black Box Affair (1966) as Chinese agent
Mi vedrai tornare (1966) as Prince Hiro Toyo
El Cisco (1966) as Capobanda
Colt in the Hand of the Devil (1967) as El Condor / Capataz
Scorpions and Miniskirts (1967) as Dr. Kung
Your Turn to Die (1967) as Chang
Tepepa (1969) as Mr. Chu
36 Hours to Hell (1969) as Major Koshiro
Have a Good Funeral, My Friend... Sartana Will Pay (1970) as Lee Tse Tung / Peng
Kill Django... Kill First (1971) as Martinez
Desert of Fire (1971) as El Marish
Roma Bene (1971) as Che Fang (uncredited)
Two Brothers in Trinity (1971) as Chinaman
La tecnica e il rito (1972, TV Movie) as Hun
La lunga cavalcata della vendetta (1972) as Ling Fu
Sotto a chi tocca! (1972) as Koyo the Balls Thrower
Colt in the Hand of the Devil (1973) as Warner
Even Angels Eat Beans (1973) as Naka Kata (uncredited)
The Big Game (1973) as Wong
The Executioner of God (1973) as Ramon Orea
Super Fly T.N.T. (1973) as Poker Player #1
Studio legale per una rapina (1973) as Lino
They Were Called Three Musketeers ... But They Were Four (1973) as Kungfu Master
Mr. Hercules Against Karate (1973) as Ming
Seven Hours of Violence (1973) as a Chinese Thug
The Fighting Fist of Shanghai Joe (1973) as Master Yang
Man with the Golden Winchester (1973) as Pedro Garincha
Six Bounty Hunters for a Massacre (1973) as Ming / Messinas
Milarepa (1974)
This Time I'll Make You Rich (1974) as Wang
Il Sergente Rompiglioni diventa... caporale (1975) as Chang
Nan quan bei tui zhan yan wang (1977) as Mayor Yuen
Yuan (1980)
The Battle for the Republic of China (1981)
The Coldest Winter in Peking (1981)
Jing hun feng yu ye (1982)
I Shall Return (1982)
Yan wang de xi yan (1982)
Zui chang de yi ye (1983)
Hei bai zhu (1983)
Da Niu Yue hua bu feng yun (1985)
Ri nei wa de huang hun (1986)
Jin zai zhi chi (2010) as Ta-Chieh's Grandfather
The Grandmaster (2013) as Third Elder (final film role)

References

External links

1918 births
2015 deaths
Male Spaghetti Western actors
Taiwanese male film actors
People from Dandong
Taiwanese people from Liaoning
20th-century Taiwanese male actors
21st-century Taiwanese male actors
Taiwanese expatriates in Italy
Taiwanese expatriates in the United States
Taiwanese expatriates in Hong Kong
Expatriate actors in Italy
Expatriate actors in the United States